Sebastian "Seb" Ryall (born 18 July 1989) is an Australian professional football (soccer) player who plays as a defender, most recently for Sydney Olympic.

Club career

Melbourne Victory
Ryall played junior football for West Pymble Football Club and Northern Spirit FC in Sydney. Ryall later played for the AIS in the Victorian Premier League before signing for Melbourne Victory on a 2-year contract in August 2007.

He made his first appearance for the club in their Round three match against Adelaide United and played in their Grand Final win over Adelaide in March 2009. In April 2009 he signed with Sydney FC for the 2009/2010 A-League campaign.

Sydney FC

He made his first start for Sydney FC after coming back from his suspension in their Round 5, 2–1 loss to Gold Coast United.

He re-signed with Sydney FC for a further two seasons, on 24 August 2010.

Ryall scored his first goal for Sydney FC in the 2011–12 A-League season with a dramatic equaliser in the 90th minute, against his former team Melbourne Victory on 26 January. Ryall's strike came less than a minute after being brought on as a substitute . Ryall continued to score important goals for Sydney against his former club, including 3 goals in 4 appearances against the Victory during the 2013–14 A-League season with goals in the Round 5, 3–2 win at Allianz Stadium, Round 16, 5–0 win on Australia Day at Etihad Stadium in Melbourne, and again in the 1-2 2013-14 Elimination Final loss against the Victory at Etihad.

Controversy surrounded Ryall during the 2014–15 A-League Round 17 clash vs the Melbourne Victory when he was awarded a penalty following a possession contest with Victory player Gui Finkler. Initial replays appeared to show Ryall simulating contact with Finkler's leg. At the time, Melbourne Victory were leading 2–1, and the resulting conversion of the penalty kick allowed Sydney FC to get back into the game. The decision to award the penalty was heavily criticized by media commentators, managers, players, and pundits alike, with former player and Fox Sports commentator Mark Bosnich reacting angrily to the decision. Melbourne Victory player Kosta Barbarouses claimed he had "lost respect" for Ryall over the incident. Ryall also drew criticism from Sydney FC coach Graham Arnold, and CEO of the club Tony Pignata over his reaction following the awarding of the penalty where he appeared to clip Finkler over his head. On 19 February, Ryall was cleared of diving by the FFA Match Review Panel, with the board taking 2 hours to clear him following reviewing slowed down footage, which showed Ryall's leg being clipped by Finkler.

Ryall signed a two-year contract extension along with teammate Rhyan Grant midway through the 2014–15 A-League season, which will keep him at the club until the end of 2017.

During Round 12 in a match against the Central Coast Mariners of the 2015/16 season, Ryall was handed the captain's armband after regular skipper Alex Brosque limped off with a recurring hamstring injury and both vice-captains Jacques Faty and Shane Smeltz starting on the bench. Ryall proceeded to earn multiple best on ground awards during his stint as skipper.

Ryall scored his first A-League goal in 3 years on 25 November, heading a free-kick from Jordy Buijs home during Sydney's 3–1 win over Brisbane Roar.

On 17 January 2018, Ryall had his contract terminated with Sydney FC at his request in order to seek a break from football, stating that he had grown "disillusioned" and grown out of favour with the sport. In doing so, allows for Ryall to pursue other opportunities outside of football and a hope to rekindle his passion for the game.

International career
Throughout 2007 and 2008 Ryall was the captain of the Australian U-20 side. Due to a suspension, Sebastian missed out on selection for the 2009 FIFA U-20 World Cup due to his criminal charges, where which he would have been assured a spot in the team. After a lengthy absence from Australia's national teams, in September 2010 he was called up to the Australian under-23 side by coach Aurelio Vidmar for a Four Nations Tournament held in Vietnam.

Court case
Ryall was charged, on 15 May 2009, with engaging in a sexual act with a 13-year-old girl. The alleged incident happened in January 2008, while he was playing with Melbourne Victory. He was suspended from participation in football matches in Australia, until 3 September as well as being stood down from the national youth team by Football Federation Australia Chief Executive Officer Ben Buckley for bringing the game into disrepute. On Monday 25 January 2010, he was committed to stand trial on the case after his committal hearing at Sydney's Downing Centre Local Court On 15 May 2010, the Director of Public Prosecutions dropped the charges against Ryall After a submission by Ryall's legal team that at the time of the alleged incident, he believed the girl to be over the legal age of 16 and that they were "just kissing"

Career statistics

Honours

Club
Melbourne Victory
 A-League Championship: 2008–09
 A-League Premiership: 2008–09
 A-League Pre-Season Challenge Cup: 2008

Sydney FC
 A-League Championship: 2009–10, 2016–17
 A-League Premiership: 2009–10, 2016–17
FFA Cup: 2017

Country
Australia
 AFF U-19 Youth Championship: 2008

References

External links
Sebastian Ryall at Aussie Footballers
 Sydney FC profile

Sebastian Ryall

1989 births
Melbourne Victory FC players
Sydney FC players
Australian Institute of Sport soccer players
New South Wales Institute of Sport alumni
Soccer players from Sydney
Living people
Association football defenders
Australian soccer players